This is a list of the seasons completed by the UCLA Bruins men's basketball team.

Seasons

 
 
 
 

  Loss later forfeited by Oregon State.
  Runner–up finish vacated due to use of ineligible players
  Loss later forfeited by California
  Steve Alford coached the first 13 games of the season, going 7–6. Interim coach Murry Bartow went 10–10 and 9–9 in conference.
  Includes 10–10 record by interim coach Murry Bartow and 9–9 record in conference.

References

 
Lists of college basketball seasons in the United States
University of California-related lists
UCLA Bruins basketball seasons